Victor John Stenger (January 29, 1935 – August 25, 2014) was an American particle physicist, philosopher, author, and religious skeptic.

Following a career as a research scientist in the field of particle physics, Stenger was associated with New Atheism and he authored popular science books. He published twelve books for general audiences on physics, quantum mechanics, cosmology, philosophy, religion, atheism, and pseudoscience, including the 2007 best-seller God: The Failed Hypothesis: How Science Shows That God Does Not Exist. His final book was God and the Multiverse: Humanity's Expanding View of the Cosmos (2014). He was a regular featured science columnist for the Huffington Post.

An advocate for removing the influence of religion from scientific research, commercial activity, and the political process, Stenger coined the quote: "Science flies you to the moon. Religion flies you into buildings".

Personal life 
Victor J. Stenger was born on January 29, 1935, and raised in a working-class neighborhood of Bayonne, New Jersey. His father was a Lithuanian immigrant, and his mother was the daughter of Hungarian immigrants. He died on August 25, 2014, at the age of 79.

Career

Education and employment
Stenger attended public schools in Bayonne, New Jersey, and received a Bachelor of Science in electrical engineering from Newark College of Engineering (now the New Jersey Institute of Technology). He then moved to Los Angeles on a Hughes Aircraft Company fellowship, earning a Master of Science and PhD in physics from UCLA.

He was a member of the Department of Physics at the University of Hawaii until his 2000 retirement. He held visiting positions on the faculties of the University of Heidelberg in Germany and Oxford University (twice) and was a visiting researcher at Rutherford Appleton Laboratory in England, the National Nuclear Physics Laboratory in Frascati, Italy, and the University of Florence in Italy. He served as an adjunct professor of philosophy at the University of Colorado at Boulder.

Scientist
Stenger's first peer-reviewed work was published in 1964, and his research career continued until his retirement in 2000. His research involved work that determined properties of gluons, quarks, strange particles, and neutrinos. Stenger focused on neutrino astronomy and very high-energy gamma rays.

Philosopher and skeptic

Stenger was an advocate of philosophical naturalism, skepticism, and atheism. He was a prominent critic of intelligent design and the aggressive use of the anthropic principle. He maintained that if consciousness and free will do exist, they will eventually be explained in a scientific manner that invokes neither the mystical nor the supernatural. He criticized those who invoke the perplexities of quantum mechanics in support of the paranormal, mysticism, or supernatural phenomena, writing several books and articles to debunk contemporary pseudoscience.

Stenger took part in the 2008 "Origins Conference" hosted by the Skeptics Society at the California Institute of Technology and debated several Christian apologists and scientists on such topics as the existence of God and the relationship between science and religion.

In 1992, Uri Geller sued Stenger and Prometheus Books for $4 million, claiming defamation for questioning his "psychic powers." The suit was dismissed and Geller was ordered to pay court costs.

Astronomer Luke Barnes argued in a 2012 paper that many of Stenger's claims about fine-tuning were problematic and that his arguments were fallacious. Stenger responded that Barnes misunderstood and misrepresented his positions.

Professional and community positions
 President, 1990–94 Hawaiian Humanists
 Member of Editorial Board, Free Inquiry
 Member of Society of Humanist Philosophers
 Fellow of the Committee for Skeptical Inquiry
 Fellow of the Center for Inquiry
 President, 2002–06, Colorado Citizens for Science

Publications by Stenger

Books for general audiences

Peer-reviewed articles

Other essays

Columnist
From 1998 to 2011 Stenger wrote for the column "Reality Check," in Skeptical Briefs, the quarterly newsletter of the Committee for Skeptical Inquiry (CSI).

Since August 2010, he was also a regularly featured science columnist for the Huffington Post.

Pantheon of skeptics
Stenger has been included in CSI's Pantheon of Skeptics.  The Pantheon of Skeptics was created by CSI to remember the legacy of deceased fellows of CSI and their contributions to the cause of scientific skepticism.

References

External links

 
 Reviews of Stenger's books.
 Audio of interview with Stenger on the podcast/radio show "Freethought" by the Freedom From Religion Foundation.

American skeptics
Critics of alternative medicine
Critics of creationism
Critics of parapsychology
New Jersey Institute of Technology alumni
Writers from Bayonne, New Jersey
American science writers
American atheism activists
1935 births
2014 deaths
American former Christians
American philosophers
Atheist philosophers
American people of Lithuanian descent
American people of Hungarian descent
Former Roman Catholics
New Atheism
University of California, Los Angeles alumni
Particle physicists
American physicists
20th-century atheists
21st-century atheists
Writers about religion and science